Bitielo Jean Jacques (born 28 December 1990 in Port-au-Prince, Haiti) is a Haitian footballer who plays for the Central Florida Crusaders in the National Indoor Soccer League.

Career
In his youth, Jean Jacques played  soccer in his native Haiti.  with Victory SC before moving to the US to play with Palm Beach State College.

His professional career began with USL Pro club River Plate Puerto Rico in 2011. After River Plate PR's withdrawal from the league, he signed with the new USL PDL franchise Ocala Stampede in 2012.

Jean Jacques returned to the professional leagues when his former coach, Matt Weston, signed him for VSI Tampa Bay FC during their 2013 pre-season.

Jean Jacques signed with Orlando City in April 2014. He was released upon the conclusion of the 2014 season, a casualty of the club's transition to Major League Soccer.

On September 20, 2022, Jean Jacques signed with the Central Florida Crusaders ahead of their inaugural National Indoor Soccer League season.

References

External links
USL Pro profile

1990 births
Living people
Sportspeople from Port-au-Prince
Haitian footballers
Haitian expatriate footballers
Haiti international footballers
Club Atlético River Plate Puerto Rico players
Ocala Stampede players
VSI Tampa Bay FC players
Orlando City SC (2010–2014) players
Expatriate footballers in Puerto Rico
Expatriate soccer players in the United States
USL Championship players
USL League Two players
2014 Caribbean Cup players
National Premier Soccer League players
2015 CONCACAF Gold Cup players
Association football defenders
Player-coaches
Soccer coaches in the United States
Haitian football managers
National Premier Soccer League coaches
Orlando City SC non-playing staff
High school soccer coaches in the United States
Palm Beach State Panthers athletes